The North-West Rebellion, also known as the North-West Resistance, was an armed resistance movement by the Métis under Louis Riel and an associated uprising by First Nations Cree and Assiniboine of the District of Saskatchewan against the Canadian government. Many Métis felt that Canada was not protecting their rights, their land, and their survival as a distinct people.

Riel had been invited to lead the movement of protest; he turned it into a military action with a heavily religious tone. That alienated Catholic clergy, whites, most Indigenous tribes, and some Métis, but he had the allegiance of 200 armed Métis, a smaller number of other Indigenous warriors, and at least one white man at Batoche in May 1885, who confronted 900 Canadian militia and some armed local residents. About 91 people would die in the fighting that occurred that spring before the conflict dissipated.

Despite some notable early victories at Duck Lake, Fish Creek, and Cut Knife, the conflict was quashed when overwhelming government forces and a critical shortage of supplies brought about the Métis' defeat in the four-day Battle of Batoche. The remaining Aboriginal allies scattered. Several chiefs were captured, and some served prison time. Eight men were hanged in Canada's largest mass hanging, for murders performed outside the military conflict.

Riel was captured, put on trial, and convicted of treason. Despite many pleas across Canada for clemency, he was hanged. Riel became a heroic martyr to Francophone Canada. That was one cause for the rise of ethnic tensions into a deep division, whose repercussions continue to be felt. The suppression of the conflict contributed to the present reality of the Prairie Provinces being controlled by English speakers, who allowed only a very limited francophone presence, and helped cause the alienation of French Canadians, who were embittered by the repression of their countrymen. The key role that the Canadian Pacific Railway played in transporting troops caused support by the Conservative government to increase, and Parliament authorized funds to complete the country's first transcontinental railway.

Nomenclature
The conflict is referred to by several names, including the North-West Rebellion, the North-West Resistance, the 1885 Resistance, the Northwest Uprising, the Saskatchewan Rebellion, and the Second Riel Rebellion. The conflict, in addition to the Red River Rebellion, was collectively referred to as the Riel Rebellions.

Although the terms rebellion and resistance can be used synonymously, its use in relation to this conflict has been a subject of debate, with some academics arguing the usage of one term changes the perspective of how the conflict is understood. As a result, Indigenous studies scholars and many historians refer to Indigenous uprisings in reaction to European colonization as resistances; owing to the fact that many Indigenous nations self-governed the land before the Canadian government exerted their sovereignty over it. Use of the term resistance has also spread to other organizations and publications, including Canadian Geographic, The Canadian Encyclopedia, and the Provincial Archives of Saskatchewan.

Background
After the Red River Rebellion of 1869–1870, many of the Métis moved from Manitoba to the Fort Carlton region of the North-West Territories, where they founded the Southbranch settlements of Fish Creek, Batoche, St. Laurent, St. Louis, and Duck Lake on or near the South Saskatchewan River. In 1882, surveyors began dividing the land of the newly formed District of Saskatchewan in the Dominion Land Survey's square concession system. The Métis lands were laid out in the seigneurial system of strips reaching back from a river which the Métis were familiar with in their French-Canadian culture. A year after the survey the 36 families of the parish of St. Louis found that their land and village site that included a church and a school (in Township 45, Range 7 west of the 2nd Meridian of the Dominion Land Survey) had been sold by the Crown to the Prince Albert Colonization Company. Not having clear title, the Métis feared losing their land which, now that the buffalo herds were gone, was their primary source of sustenance.

In 1884, the Métis (including the Anglo-Métis) asked Louis Riel to return from the United States, where he had fled after the Red River Rebellion  to appeal to the government on their behalf.  The government gave a vague response. In March 1885, Riel, Gabriel Dumont, Honoré Jackson (a.k.a. Will Jackson), and others set up the Provisional Government of Saskatchewan, believing that they could influence the federal government in the same way as they had in 1869.

The role of aboriginal peoples prior to—and during—the outbreak of the conflict is often misunderstood. A number of factors have created the misconception that the Cree and Métis were acting in unison. By the end of the 1870s, the stage was set for discontent among the aboriginal people of the prairies: the bison population was in serious decline (creating enormous economic difficulties) and, in an attempt to assert control over aboriginal settlement, the federal government often violated the terms of the treaties it had signed during the latter part of the decade.  Thus, widespread dissatisfaction with the treaties and rampant poverty spurred Big Bear, a Cree chief, to embark on a diplomatic campaign to renegotiate the terms of the treaties (the timing of this campaign happened to coincide with an increased sense of frustration among the Métis).  When the Cree initiated violence in the spring of 1885, it was almost certainly unrelated to the revolt of Riel and the Métis (which was already underway). In both the Frog Lake Massacre and the Looting of Battleford, small dissident groups of Cree men revolted against the authority of Big Bear and Poundmaker. Although he quietly signalled to Ottawa that these two incidents were the result of desperate and starving people and were, as such, unrelated to the conflict, Edgar Dewdney, the lieutenant-governor of the territories, publicly claimed that the Cree and the Métis had joined forces.

For Riel and the Métis, several factors had changed since the Red River Rebellion. The railway had been completed across the prairies in 1883, though sections were still under construction north of Lake Superior, making it easier for the government to get troops into the area. In addition, the North-West Mounted Police (NWMP) had been created, developing an armed local force. Riel lacked support from English settlers of the area as well as the great majority of tribes. Riel's claim that God had sent him back to Canada as a prophet caused Catholic officials (who saw it as heresy) to try to minimize his support. The Catholic priest, Albert Lacombe, worked to obtain assurances from Crowfoot that his Blackfoot warriors would not participate in a conflict.

Demographics

The District of Saskatchewan, part of the North-West Territories in 1885, was divided into three sub-districts and had a population of 10,595. To the east, the Carrot River sub-district with 1,770 people remained quiet. The Prince Albert sub-district located in the centre of the district had a population of 5,373 which included the Southbranch settlements with about 1,300. The South branch settlement was the centre of Louis Riel's Provisional Government of Saskatchewan during the conflict. To the west, where the Cree uprising led by Poundmaker and Big Bear occurred, was the Battleford sub-district with 3,603 people.

The largest settlement and the capital of the district was Prince Albert with about 800 people followed by Battleford with about 500 people who were "divided about equally between French, Métis and English".

The Métis population in Saskatchewan in 1885 was about 5,400. A majority tried to stay neutral in the dispute with the national government, as the priests recommended. About 350 armed men supported Riel.  A smaller number opposed him, led by Charles Nolin. In addition, he had the support of a small number of members of First Nations. Riel's supporters included the older, less assimilated Métis, often with close associations with the First Nations population. Many moved back and forth into First Nations communities and preferred to speak Indigenous languages more than French. Riel's opponents were younger, better educated Métis; they wanted to be more integrated into Canadian society, not to set up a separate domain as Riel promised.

Course of war
Riel had been invited in to lead the movement but he turned it into a military action with a heavily religious tone, thereby alienating the Catholic clergy, the whites, nearly all of the First Nations, and most of the Métis. He had a force of a couple hundred Métis and a smaller number of First Nations at Batoche in May 1885, confronting 900 government troops.

Outbreak

On March 26, 1885, the 150 to 200 Métis and Aboriginal warriors under the command of Gabriel Dumont defeated a combined group of 90 Prince Albert Volunteers and North-West Mounted Police led by their superintendent Leif Newry Fitzroy Crozier at Battle of Duck Lake, outside Batoche. The federal government had, shortly before the battle at Duck Lake, sent Major General Frederick Middleton to the West. Eventually, over a period of many weeks, Middleton brought 3,000 troops to the West, and incorporated another 2,000, mostly English-Canadian volunteers, and 500 North-West Mounted Police into his force.

On March 30, 1885, a raiding party of Cree people, short of food due to declining bison populations, approached Battleford. The inhabitants fled to the nearby North-West Mounted Police post, Fort Battleford. The Cree then took food and supplies from the empty stores and houses. As well, Cree insurgents looted Hudson's Bay Company posts at Lac la Biche and Green Lake on April 26.

On April 2, 1885, at Frog Lake, Saskatchewan (now in Alberta) a Cree raiding party led by Cree war chief, Wandering Spirit, attacked the small town. Angered by what seemed to be unfair treaties and the withholding of vital provisions by the Canadian government, and also by the dwindling buffalo population, their main source of food, Big Bear and his Cree decided to rebel after the successful Métis victory at Duck Lake. They gathered all the white settlers in the area into the local church. They killed Thomas Quinn, the town's Indian agent, after a disagreement broke out. The Cree then attacked the settlers, killing eight more and taking three captive.

The massacre prompted the Canadian government to take notice of the growing unrest in the North-West Territories. When the conflict was over, the government hanged Wandering Spirit, the war chief responsible for the Frog Lake Massacre.

On April 15, 1885, 200 Cree warriors descended on Fort Pitt. They intercepted a police scouting party, killing a constable, wounding another, and captured a third. Surrounded and outnumbered, garrison commander Francis Dickens capitulated and agreed to negotiate with the attackers. Big Bear released the remaining police officers but kept the townspeople as hostages and destroyed the fort. Six days later, Inspector Dickens and his men reached safety at Battleford.

Government mobilization

Recognizing that an uprising might be imminent, the federal government had, three days before Duck Lake, sent Major General Frederick Middleton, the commander of the Canadian Militia, to Winnipeg, where a unit of militia, the 90th Winnipeg Rifles, and of militia artillery, the Winnipeg Field Battery, already existed. After Duck Lake, the government immediately commenced the mobilization of some of Canada's ill-equipped part-time militia units (the Non-Permanent Active Militia), as well as the units of cavalry, artillery and infantry regulars that made up the tiny Permanent Active Militia, Canada's almost-nonexistent regular army. By March 30, after hasty mobilization in Toronto, two trains containing the 10th Royal Grenadiers and Queen's Own Rifles militia battalions were ready to leave Toronto. Other militia units, the 9th Voltigeurs from Quebec City, and the 65th Mount Royal Rifles from Montreal, were also quickly mobilized. Soon every major city in the East was the scene of embarkation for inexperienced young militiamen cheered by immense crowds.

The first militia to struggle westward had to contend with the many lengthy breaks in the CPR line in northern Ontario. They marched through snow, or were carried in exposed sleighs. Where there were short stretches of track, the militia rode on hastily-constructed railroad flatcars which did nothing to shelter them from the extreme cold. Many of the soldiers suffered greatly from the winter weather. However, the first troops sent west were, in succeeding weeks, followed by thousands more.

Other forces such as the Alberta Field Force led by Thomas Bland Strange were formed in the West.

April–May Métis victories
On April 24, 1885, at Fish Creek, 200 Métis achieved a remarkable victory over a superior government force numbering 900 soldiers who were sent to quell the conflict. The reversal, though not decisive enough to alter the outcome of the war, temporarily halted Major General Frederick Middleton's column's advance on Batoche. That was where the Métis would later make their final stand.

On May 2, 1885, the Cree war chief Fine-Day successfully held off Lieutenant Colonel William Otter at the Battle of Cut Knife near Battleford. Despite its use of a gatling gun, a flying column of Canadian militia was forced to retreat. Fine-Day was affiliated with the chief Poundmaker. Big Bear did not get involved.

Ending the conflict
On May 9, 1885, Middleton attacked Batoche itself. The greatly outnumbered Métis ran out of ammunition after three days of battle and siege. The Métis resorted to firing sharp objects and small rocks from their guns, until they were killed or dispersed when Middleton's soldiers advanced in strength and overran their rifle pits. Riel surrendered on May 15. Gabriel Dumont and other participants escaped across the border to the Montana Territory of the United States. The defeat of the Métis and Riel's capture led to the collapse of the Provisional Government.

But the downfall of Batoche did not end the separate conflict with the Cree. By May 28, 1885, Major General Thomas Bland Strange brought a force of militia, including a NWMP detachment, from Calgary, Alberta, into contact with a fleeing Cree force under Big Bear. The Native fighters carried the day at Frenchman's Butte in a battle at the end of May.

The last armed engagement in the conflict was the Battle of Loon Lake. On June 3, 1885, a small detachment of NWMP under the command of Major Sam Steele caught up to Big Bear's force which was moving northward after their victory at Frenchman's Butte. Big Bear's fighters were almost out of ammunition, and fled after a short exchange of fire and the release of their hostages.

Demoralized, defenceless, and with no hope of relief after Poundmaker's defeat, most of Big Bear's fighters surrendered over the next few weeks. On July 2 Big Bear surrendered to the NWMP on an island in the Saskatchewan River near Fort Carlton. The government addressed the critical food shortage of the Cree and Assiniboine by sending food and other supplies. Poundmaker and Big Bear were sentenced to prison. Eight others were hanged in the largest mass hanging in Canadian history. These men, found guilty of killing outside of the military conflict, were Wandering Spirit, (Kapapamahchakwew) a Plains Cree war chief, Little Bear (Apaschiskoos), Walking the Sky (AKA Round the Sky), Bad Arrow, Miserable Man, Iron Body, Ika (AKA Crooked Leg) and Man Without Blood, for murders committed at Frog Lake and at Battleford (the murders of Farm Instructor Payne and Battleford farmer Barney Tremont).

Aftermath

The trial of Louis Riel occurred shortly after the conflict, where he was found guilty of high treason, and hanged. His trial sparked a national controversy between English and French Canada.

The Canadian Pacific Railway (CPR) played a key role in the government's response to the conflict, as it was able to transport federal troops to the area quickly. While it had taken three months to get troops to the Red River Rebellion, the government was able to move forces in nine days by train in response to events in the North-West Territories. The successful operation increased political support for the floundering and incomplete railway, which had been close to financial collapse. The government authorized enough funds to finish the line. Thus, Prime Minister John A. Macdonald was able to realize his National Dream of linking Canada across the continent.

After the fighting, new Territorial Council ridings were created, although still only covering specific areas of concentrated settlement. The North-West Territories election of 1885 was held. The Scrip Commission was dispatched to the District of Saskatchewan and to present-day Alberta to address Métis land claims.

The conflict was Canada's first independent military action. It cost about $5 million, and lost the Conservative Party most of their support in Quebec. It guaranteed Anglophone control of the Prairies, and demonstrated the national government was capable of decisive action. Those who served with the Militia and Police during the conflict received the North West Canada Medal, established in September 1885.

International reaction
While the conflict was ongoing, the American and British press took note of the actions of both the Métis and the Canadian Government. Some newspapers, such as the Times and Guardian, wrote approvingly of the actions taken by the Canadian government.

Long-term consequences
The Saskatchewan Métis requested land grants; they were all provided by the government by the end of 1887, and the government resurveyed the Métis river lots in accordance with their wishes. The Métis did not understand the long term value of their new land, however, and sold much of it to speculators who later resold it to farmers. The French language and Catholic religion faced increasing marginalisation in both Saskatchewan and Manitoba, as exemplified by the emerging controversy surrounding the Manitoba Schools Question. The Métis were increasingly forced to live on undesirable land or in the shadow of Indian reserves (as the Métis did not have treaty status as Indians with a right to land).

Riel's trial and Macdonald's refusal to commute his sentence caused lasting upset in Quebec, and led to a fundamental francophone distrust of Anglophone politicians. French Canada felt it had been unfairly targeted.

Memory
In the spring of 2008, Tourism, Parks, Culture and Sport Minister Christine Tell proclaimed in Duck Lake, that "the 125th commemoration, in 2010, of the 1885 Northwest Rebellion is an excellent opportunity to tell the story of the prairie Métis and First Nations peoples' struggle with Government forces and how it has shaped Canada today."

Batoche, where the Métis Provisional Government had been formed, has been declared a National Historic Site. Batoche marks the site of Gabriel Dumont's grave site, Albert Caron's House, Batoche school, Batoche cemetery, Letendre store, Dumont's river crossing, Gariépy's crossing, Batoche crossing, St. Antoine de Padoue Church, Métis rifle pits, and RNWMP battle camp.

Fort Carlton Provincial Historic Site has been rebuilt as it had been ravaged by three separate fires. Big Bear (Mistahimaskwa) had used the site in his initial negotiations for Treaty Six in about 1884, and finally, the following year he surrendered here after his engagement at Steele Narrows. The Prince Albert blockhouse was employed by the North-West Mounted Police on evacuating from Fort Carlton after the first fire. Duck Lake is home to the Duck Lake Historical Museum and the Duck Lake Regional Interpretive Centre, and murals which reflect the history of the conflict in the area. The Battle of Duck Lake, the Duck Lake Massacre, and a buffalo jump are all located here. The "First Shots Cairn" was erected on Saskatchewan Highway 212 as a landmark commemorating the scene of the first shots in the Battle of Duck Lake. Our Lady of Lourdes Shrine at St. Laurent north of Duck Lake is a local pilgrimage site. The Battle of Fish Creek National Historic Site, the name has been changed to Tourond's Coulee / Fish Creek National Historic Site to preserve the battlefield of April 24, 1885, at la coulée des Tourond, Madame Tourond's home, early Red River cart Fish Creek Trail and the site of Middleton's camp and graveyard.

The Marr Residence is a municipal heritage property of Saskatoon which served as a field hospital for wounded soldiers during the conflict. Fort Otter was constructed at Battleford's government house located at the capital of the North-West Territories. Poundmaker was arrested at Fort Battleford and sentenced to a prison term. Eight First Nations men were hanged, five for murders in the Frog Lake Massacre, two for murders in the Battleford area, and one for the killing of a Mountie at Fort Pitt on April 15.  Fort Battleford has been declared a national historic site of Canada to commemorate its role as military base of operations for Cut Knife Hill, Fort Pitt, as a refuge for 500 settlers and its role in the Siege of Battleford. Fort Pitt, the scene of the Battle of Fort Pitt, is a provincial park and national historic site where a National Historic Sites and Monuments plaque designates where Treaty Six was signed. Frog Lake Massacre National Historic Site of Canada, at Frog Lake, Alberta, is the location of a Cree uprising that occurred in the District of Saskatchewan, North-West Territories. Frenchman Butte is a national historic site of Canada. It is the location of an 1885 battle between Cree and Canadian troops.

At Cutknife is the world's largest tomahawk, the Poundmaker Historical Centre and Big Bear monument erected by cairn erected by the Historic Sites and Monuments Board of Canada. There is also now, correctly located, a cairn erected upon Cut Knife Hill the look site of the Poundmaker Battle site and Battle River valley.  The Narrows between Makwa Lake and Sanderson Bay, in the Makwa Lake Provincial Park, was the site of the last engagement of the conflict. Steele Narrows Provincial Historic Park conserves the lookout point of a Cree burial ground.  The Royal Canadian Mounted Police training depot at Regina was established in 1874, and still survives. The RCMP chapel, a frame building built in 1885, is still standing. It was used to jail Indian prisoners. One of three Territorial Government Buildings remains on Dewdney Avenue in the provincial capital city of Regina which was the site of the Trial of Louis Riel, where the drama the Trial of Louis Riel is still performed. Following the May trial, Louis Riel was hanged November 16, 1885. The RCMP Heritage Centre, in Regina, opened in May 2007. The Métis brought his body to Saint-Vital, his mother's home, now the Riel House National Historic Site, and then interred it at the Saint-Boniface Basilica in Manitoba, his birthplace, for burial. Highway 11, stretching from Regina to just south of Prince Albert, has been named Louis Riel Trail by the province; the roadway passes near locations of the conflict.

The members of the Canadian Militia are commemorated through a number of memorials in Canada, including the North-West Rebellion Monument in Queen's Park, in Toronto, Ontario, and The Volunteer Monument in Winnipeg, Manitoba. A statue for Wm. B. Osgoode and John Rogers, who fell in action at Cutknife Hill, also stands at the Cartier Square Drill Hall, in Ottawa, Ontario.

Historiography
Arthur Silver Morton, who was the University of Saskatchewan's first librarian, compiled many of the original manuscripts, transcripts, and photographs related to the 1885 conflict that were made available in 1995 as part of project funded by Industry Canada in 1995.

Canadian historian George Stanley conducted research on the 1885 conflict and Louis Riel in the 1930s while completing his postgraduate degrees at Oxford University, where he published his 1936 book The Birth of Western Canada: A History of The Riel Rebellion. For more than five decades Stanley's 1936 The Birth of Western Canada was reprinted and used as a textbook. Stanley's 1936 book and the 1972 book published by his student Desmond MortonThe last war drum: the North West campaign of 1885 informed North-West Rebellion encyclopedia entries in the Canadian Encyclopedia and Encyclopedia Britannica. Stanley focused on the racial aspects of the rebellion. He demonstrated empathy with the plight of the Metis and First Nations, although in hindsight his work would now be described by many as both "racist and close-minded". Until the early 2000s, Stanley's served as the foundational text book providing the accepted narrative on the events.

The next major academic work to treat the "rebellion as a whole" since Stanley's, was the 1984 publication Prairie Fire: The 1885 North-West Rebellion by historian Bob Beal and journalist Rod Macleod. They downplayed the event as local with "no real legacy of bitterness in the West". They describe it as an incident during the white settlers' occupation of the North-West Territories and government's imposition of their laws on the indigenous population.

On the centenary of the conflict, a conference entitled "1885 and After: Native Society in Transition" was held in May at the University of Saskatchewan. During the centenary, a number of articles and books were published on the topic including the five-volume The Collected Writings of Louis Riel by Stanley, Raymond Huel, Gilles Martel, and University of Calgary-based political scientist, Thomas Flanagan, and Flanagan's Riel and the Rebellion: 1885 Reconsidered. Flanagan spent much of his academic career focusing on issues related to the Métis and Louis Riel. Since the 1970s Tom Flanagan published numerous scholarly studies "debunking the heroism of Métis icon Louis Riel, arguing against native land claims, and calling for an end to aboriginal rights." He served as consultant and expert witness in multiple litigations related to land claims, including Métis land claims and aboriginal collective rights. He was highly critical of the way in which section 35 of the Constitution Act, 1982, acknowledged existing aboriginal and treaty rights resulting in a flood of law suits involving aboriginal, treaty rights, Metis land claims and residential school claims.

In his 1987 publication, Footprints in the Dust, Douglas Light, focused on the local history of the region incorporating Métis and First Nation perspectives on events including accounts of everyday life. This was described as a "valuable and distinctive contribution to rebellion historiography".

At the University of Saskatchewan, Alan Anderson prepared a report on French Settlements in Saskatchewan which informed relevant content in the online Encyclopedia of Saskatchewan published in 2006 by the University of Regina's Canadian Plains Research Center.

J.R.Miller's 1989 Skyscrapers Hide the Heavens was described in a 2021 British Journal of Canadian Studies article as the "first overall survey of Aboriginal–newcomer history in Canada". Miller "consistently highlighted the Aboriginal perspective". By 2018, when the book was reprinted for the fourth time, the relationships between Indigenous peoples and settlers had evolved further driven by priorities, economic opportunities, collective action on the part of Indigenous communities, and changes in governments at the federal, provincial and territorial levels. Miller says that early relations between Indigenous people and Euro-Canadian were characterized by a mutuality and collaboration, with each remaining autonomous, especially in trading relationships and as military allies. Miller says that this mutuality "held good for far longer than white historiography has tended to see. The mutuality collapsed through competition for resources particularly as agricultural settlers arrived in increasing numbers. In his chapter on the rebellion, Miller says that the way histories about the conflict have been written are based on "a great deal of misunderstanding and myth-making" and that there was no Indian rebellion in 1885.

Lawrence J. Barkwell's 2005 book Batoche 1885: The Militia of the Metis Liberation Movement was his first publication of biographies of participants in the Metis resistance. Barkwell is also the author of the 2011 305-page book Veterans and Families of the 1885 Northwest Resistance. He updated his "1885 Northwest Resistance Movement Biographies" in 2018 which lists the men and women who participated in the 1885 Northwest Resistance. Barwell's research, which is published by the Gabriel Dumont Institutean affiliate of the University of Saskatchewan and the University of Regina"provides a more human face" to the 1885 Resistance."

In fiction
 Stewart Sterling's Red Trails (1935) depicted the pulp hero Eric Lewis, a Mountie of the Royal Northwest Mounted Police. He tries to keep "peace and order" during the North-West Rebellion, helped by Sergeant Tim Clone.
 North West Mounted Police, by Cecil B. DeMille (1940). The film is about a Texas Ranger who joins forces with the North-West Mounted Police to put down the rebellion.
 The Magnificent Failure (1967) by Giles Lutz is a historical novel of the North-West Rebellion.
 Lord of the Plains, by Albert Silver, c 1990, Ballantine Books. Spur Award Finalist. Focuses on Gabriel Dumont and his family.
 The novel for young adults called Battle Cry at Batoche (1998), by B. J. Bayle, portrays the events of the North-West Resistance from a Métis point of view.
 Song of Batoche, by Maia Caron (Ronsdale Press: 2017), a historical novel centered on the North-West Rebellion through the perspectives of Métis women, Gabriel Dumont, Louis Riel, and others involved.

See also

 Index of articles related to Aboriginal Canadians
 List of conflicts in Canada
 Military history of Canada

References

Further reading

 
 
 Barrett, Matthew. "'Hero of the Half-Breed Rebellion': Gabriel Dumont and Late Victorian Military Masculinity." Journal of Canadian Studies/Revue d'études canadiennes 48#3 (2014): 79–107.
 
 
 
 , military history
 
 
 Wade, Mason. The French Canadians; 1760-1967: vol 2: 1911–1967 (1968) pp 393–446 online
 Waite, Peter B. Canada 1874-1896 (McClelland & Stewart, 1978), pp 146–74
  online
 , short summary of historians' views
 Lee, David. "The Metis militant rebels of 1885." Canadian Ethnic Studies/ Etudes Ethniques au Canada (1989) 21#3 pp 1+  online
 Miller, J. R. "From Riel to the Metis." Canadian Historical Review 69#1 (1988): 1–20.
 , historiography
 Morton, Desmond. "Image of Louis Riel in 1998," Canadian Speeches  (May 1998) 12#2 online
 
 
 Stanley, George F.G. Louis Riel: Patriot or Rebel?  Canadian Historical Association Booklet No. 2 (1979) online

External links

 (Métis) Heroes of the 1885 Northwest Resistance. Summary of those Killed.
 
 Diary of Walter F. Stewart, a first hand account of a man who was there
 Map of Battle Sites
 Chronology of Events (The Northwest Resistance)

 
1885 in Canada
Civil wars involving the states and peoples of North America
Conflicts in Canada
First Nations history
Indigenous conflicts in Canada
Louis Riel
Massacres in Canada
Métis in Canada
North-West Rebellion
Rebellions in Canada
Surveying of Canada
History of Western Canada
Canadian Militia